A Long Way to Nowhere may refer to:
A Long Way to Nowhere, an album by the Parkinsons
"A Long Way to Nowhere", a song by Sentenced from The Funeral Album
"Long Way to Nowhere", an episode of the drama series Movin' On